This is a list of French football transfers in the 2014 summer transfer window.

References

French
Transfers Summer 2014
2014